James H. Ditchfield (1865 – 1933) was an English footballer who played at inside-left for Burslem Port Vale between 1886 and 1896.

Career
Ditchfield joined Burslem Port Vale from Rossendale in the summer of 1886. On his debut game, Vale lost 7–0 to Preston North End in a friendly. He soon became a regular though, and with eight strikes was top-scorer for the 1888–89 season, and in 1891 he helped the side share the North Staffordshire Charity Challenge Cup. He converted to a central defensive position in September 1892, and played there 11 times in the first ever season of the Football League Second Division. However, he picked up an ankle injury, and, other one appearance in the 1895–96 season, was not seen again at the Athletic Ground.

Career statistics
Source:

Honours
Port Vale
North Staffordshire Charity Challenge Cup: 1891

References

1865 births
1933 deaths
English footballers
Footballers from Bolton
Association football forwards
Port Vale F.C. players
English Football League players